Miguel Pedro Ostersen Hernández (born January 11, 1980, in Mexico City, Mexico) is a Mexican footballer who currently plays for Coronel Bolognesi in Peru. He is from Danish and native Mexican descent.

References

External links
 
 

1980 births
Living people
Mexican people of Danish descent
Mexican expatriate footballers
Mexican footballers
Liga MX players
Association football midfielders
Footballers from Mexico City
Club Necaxa footballers
Coronel Bolognesi footballers